Kotamobagu West (or Kotamobagu Barat ) is a district in Kotamobagu, North Sulawesi, Indonesia

References

External links
  Kotamobagu government website
 Kotamobagu Map — Satellite Images of Kotamobagu

Kotamobagu
Districts of North Sulawesi